Robert Davison (born January 7, 1978)  is a Canadian former competitive pair skater. With partner Pascale Bergeron, he placed 6th at the 2005 Four Continents Championships and won the silver medals at the 2003 Finlandia Trophy and the 2003 & 2004 Nebelhorn Trophy. Before teaming up with Bergeron, Davison competed with Keridawn Thomson.

Davison was born in Calgary, Alberta, Canada.

Competitive highlights
(with Bergeron)

References

 
 

Canadian male pair skaters
Living people
1978 births
Figure skaters from Calgary
20th-century Canadian people
21st-century Canadian people